Quercus copeyensis is a species of oak endemic to the Talamancan montane forests of Costa Rica and Panama. It is commonly called Panamanian oak.

References

External links
 University of Costa Rica, Biology School: Quercus copeyensis

copeyensis
Trees of Costa Rica
Plants described in 1942
Trees of Panama
Flora of the Talamancan montane forests